The Reader's Digest Select Editions are a series of hardcover fiction anthology books, published bi-monthly and available by subscription, from Reader's Digest.  Each volume consists of four or five current bestselling novels selected by Digest editors and abridged (or "condensed") to shorter form to accommodate the anthology format.

This series is the renamed version of the long-running anthology series Reader's Digest Condensed Books.

Novels by volume

1997

Volume 229 - #1
 The Runaway Jury - John Grisham
 Critical Judgment - Michael Palmer
 Icon - Frederick Forsyth
 Capitol Offense - Senator Barbara Mikulski & Mary Louise Oates

Volume 230 - #2
 The Third Twin - Ken Follett
 Small Town Girl - LaVyrle Spencer
 To the Hilt - Dick Francis
 The Burning Man - Phillip Margolin

Volume 231 - #3
 A Woman's Place - Barbara Delinsky
 The Unlikely Spy - Daniel Silva
 The Cat Who Tailed a Thief - Lilian Jackson Braun
 Beyond Recognition - Ridley Pearson

Volume 232 - #4
 The Escape Artist - Diane Chamberlain
 Airframe - Michael Crichton
 Weeding Out the Tears - Jeanne White with Susan Dworkin
 Infinity's Child - Harry Stein

Volume 233 - #5
 The Partner - John Grisham
 All God's Children - Thomas Eidson
 Medusa's Child - John J. Nance
 Only Son - Kevin O'Brien

Volume 234 - #6
 Pretend You Don't See Her - Mary Higgins Clark
 The Big Picture - Douglas Kennedy
 A Place to Call Home - Deborah Smith
 Chromosome 6 - Robin Cook

1998

Volume 235 - #1
 Guilt - John Lescroart
 Only Love - Erich Segal
 Five Past Midnight - James Thayer
 Three Wishes - Barbara Delinsky

Volume 236 - #2
 Plum Island - Nelson DeMille
 Homecoming - Belva Plain
 10 Lb. Penalty - Dick Francis
 The Starlite Drive-In - Marjorie Reynolds

Volume 237 - #3
 The Winner - David Baldacci
 Homeport - Nora Roberts
 Flight of Eagles - Jack Higgins
 Then Came Heaven - LaVyrle Spencer

Volume 238 - #4
 The Street Lawyer - John Grisham
 Message in a Bottle - Nicholas Sparks
 The Cobra Event - Richard Preston
 Sooner or Later - Elizabeth Adler

Volume 239 - #5
 You Belong to Me - Mary Higgins Clark
 American Dreams - John Jakes
 Toxin - Robin Cook
 Firebird - Janice Graham

Volume 240 - #6
 No Safe Place - Richard North Patterson
 Somebody's Baby - Elaine Kagan
 Riptide - Douglas Preston & Lincoln Child
 The Coffin Dancer - Jeffery Deaver

1999

Volume 241 - #1
 The Loop - Nicholas Evans
 "N" Is for Noose - Sue Grafton
 Coast Road - Barbara Delinsky
 The Eleventh Commandment - Jeffrey Archer

Volume 242 - #2
 Rainbow Six - Tom Clancy
 Cloud Nine - Luanne Rice
 The Simple Truth - David Baldacci
 The Cat Who Saw Stars - Lilian Jackson Braun

Volume 243 - #3
 The Hammer of Eden - Ken Follett
 Welcome to the World, Baby Girl! - Fannie Flagg
 Stonewall's Gold - Robert J. Mrazek
 River's End - Nora Roberts

Volume 244 - #4
 The Testament - John Grisham
 The Snow Falcon - Stuart Harrison
 Terminal Event - James Thayer
 Liberty Falling - Nevada Barr

Volume 245 - #5
 We'll Meet Again - Mary Higgins Clark
 The Marching Season - Daniel Silva
 Miss Julia Speaks Her Mind - Ann B. Ross
 8.4 - Peter Hernon

Volume 246 - #6
 Lake News - Barbara Delinsky
 The Devil's Teardrop - Jeffery Deaver
 A Walk to Remember - Nicholas Sparks
 Thunderhead - Douglas Preston & Lincoln Child

2000

Volume 247 - #1
 Black Notice - Patricia Cornwell
 Eddie's Bastard - William Kowalski
 Boundary Waters - William Kent Krueger
 The Innocents Within - Robert Daley

Volume 248 - #2
 Follow the Stars Home - Luanne Rice
 Hunting Badger - Tony Hillerman
 The Quiet Game - Greg Iles
 Second Wind - Dick Francis

Volume 249 - #3
 Blackout - John J. Nance
 Angel Falls - Kristin Hannah
 Void Moon - Michael Connelly
 The Kingsley House - Arliss Ryan

Volume 250 - #4
 The Lion's Game - Nelson DeMille
 Handyman - Linda Nichols
 The Patient - Michael Palmer
 Round Robin - Jennifer Chiaverini

Volume 251 - #5
 Ghost Moon - Karen Robards
 The Empty Chair - Jeffery Deaver
 Hawke's Cove - Susan Wilson
 The Color of Hope - Susan Madison

Volume 252 - #6
 Before I Say Good-bye - Mary Higgins Clark
 Julie and Romeo - Jeanne Ray
 Demolition Angel - Robert Crais
 Winter Solstice - Rosamunde Pilcher

2001

Volume 253 - #1
 The Rescue - Nicholas Sparks
 Code to Zero - Ken Follett
 My Mother's Daughter - Judith Henry Wall
 Even Steven - John Gilstrap

Volume 254 - #2
 Running Blind - Lee Child
 Dream Country - Luanne Rice
 Shattered - Dick Francis
 A Certain Slant of Light - Cynthia Thayer

Volume 255 - #3
 The Villa - Nora Roberts
 24 Hours - Greg Iles
 Nora, Nora - Anne Rivers Siddons
 Force 12 - James Thayer

Volume 256 - #4
 Peace Like a River - Leif Enger
 "P" Is for Peril - Sue Grafton
 Summer Island - Kristin Hannah
 The Incumbent - Brian McGrory

Volume 257 - #5
 The Ice Child - Elizabeth McGregor
 The Blue Nowhere - Jeffery Deaver
 Suzanne's Diary for Nicholas - James Patterson
 Back When We Were Grownups - Anne Tyler

Volume 258 - #6
 Summer Light - Luanne Rice
 Echo Burning - Lee Child
 The Rich Part of Life - Jim Kokoris
 On the Street Where You Live - Mary Higgins Clark

2002

Volume 259 - #1
 Envy - Sandra Brown
 Secret Sanction - Brian Haig
 Entering Normal - Anne D. LeClair
 A Mulligan for Bobby Jobe - Bob Cullen

Volume 260 - #2
 A Bend in the Road - Nicholas Sparks
 The Woman Next Door - Barbara Delinsky
 Jackdaws - Ken Follett
 Long Time No See - Susan Isaacs

Volume 261 - #3
 Safe Harbor - Luanne Rice
 The Analyst - John Katzenbach
 Fallen Angel - Don J. Snyder
 Open Season - C. J. Box

Volume 262 - #4
 The Stone Monkey - Jeffery Deaver
 Step-Ball-Change - Jeanne Ray
 The Smoke Jumper - Nicholas Evans
 The Wailing Wind - Tony Hillerman

Volume 263 - #5
 Daddy's Little Girl - Mary Higgins Clark
 Without Fail - Lee Child
 Flight Lessons - Patricia Gaffney
 Three Weeks in Paris - Barbara Taylor Bradford

Volume 264 - #6
 An Accidental Woman - Barbara Delinsky
 2nd Chance - James Patterson
 Distant Shores - Kristin Hannah
 City of Bones - Michael Connelly

2003

Volume 265 - #1
 Chesapeake Blue - Nora Roberts
 No One to Trust - Iris Johansen
 Standing in the Rainbow - Fannie Flagg
 In the Bleak Midwinter - Julia Spencer-Fleming

Volume 266 - #2
 Hornet Flight - Ken Follett
 Leaving Eden - Ann LeClaire
 "Q" Is for Quarry - Sue Grafton
 Nights in Rodanthe - Nicholas Sparks

Volume 267 - #3
 The Last Promise - Richard Paul Evans
 Danger Zone - Shirley Palmer
 Not a Sparrow Falls - Linda Nichols
 Street Boys - Lorenzo Carcaterra

Volume 268 - #4
 Proof of Intent - William J. Coughlin & Walter Sorrells
 Eat Cake - Jeanne Ray
 The Vanished Man - Jeffery Deaver
 The Secret Hour - Luanne Rice

Volume 269 - #5
 Final Witness - Simon Tolkien
 The Guardian - Nicholas Sparks
 The Second Time Around - Mary Higgins Clark
 Between Sisters - Kristin Hannah

Volume 270 - #6
 Avenger - Frederick Forsyth
 Waterloo Station - Emily Grayson
 Flirting With Pete - Barbara Delinsky
 The Anniversary - Amy Gutman

2004

Volume 271 - #1
 Cold Pursuit - T. Jefferson Parker
 Temporary Sanity - Rose Connors
 The Forever Year - Ronald Anthony
 Lover's Lane - Jill Marie Landis

Volume 272 - #2
 Drifting - Stephanie Gertler
 A Perfect Day - Richard Paul Evans
 Beachcomber - Karen Robards
 Split Second - David Baldacci

Volume 273 - #3
 Summer Harbor - Susan Wilson
 The Wedding - Nicholas Sparks
 The Conspiracy Club - Jonathan Kellerman
 The Sight of the Stars - Belva Plain

Volume 274 - #4
 The Curious Incident of the Dog in the Night-Time - Mark Haddon
 The Promise of a Lie - Howard Roughan
 PS, I Love You - Cecelia Ahern
 Letter from Home - Carolyn G. Hart

Volume 275 - #5
 The Valley of Light - Terry Kay
 Killer Smile - Lisa Scottoline
 Sam's Letters to Jennifer - James Patterson
 The Zero Game - Brad Meltzer

Volume 276 - #6
 Some Danger Involved - Will Thomas
 Blood Is the Sky - Steve Hamilton
 Maximum Security - Rose Connors
 Nighttime Is My Time - Mary Higgins Clark

2005

Volume 277 - #1
 Three Weeks with My Brother - Nicholas Sparks and Micah Sparks
 The Things We Do for Love - Kristin Hannah
 The Murder Artist - John Case
 Night Train to Lisbon - Emily Grayson

Volume 278 - #2
 Skeleton Man - Tony Hillerman
 Whiteout - Ken Follett
 Redbird Christmas - Fannie Flagg
 The Summer I Dared - Barbara Delinsky

Volume 279 - #3
 Kill the Messenger - Tami Hoag
 A Northern Light - Jennifer Donnelly
 Murder at the B-School - Jeffrey L. Cruikshank
 The Queen of the Big Time - Adriana Trigiani

Volume 280 - #4
 Mosaic - Soheir Khashoggi
 Diving Through Clouds - Nicola Lindsay
 One Shot - Lee Child
 Bait - Karen Robards

Volume 281 - #5
 The Closers - Michael Connelly
 The Ladies of Garrison Gardens - Louise Shaffer
 Heartbreak Hotel - Jill Marie Landis
 Julie and Romeo Get Lucky - Jeanne Ray

Volume 282 - #6
 This Dame for Hire - Sandra Scoppettone
 False Testimony: A Crime Novel - Rose Connors
 No Place Like Home - Mary Higgins Clark
 Twisted - Jonathan Kellerman

2006

Volume 283 - #1
 The Undomestic Goddess - Sophie Kinsella
 True Believer - Nicholas Sparks
 The Double Eagle - James Twining
 One Soldier's Story: A Memoir - Bob Dole

Volume 284 - #2
 Sacred Cows - Karen E. Olson
 Lifeguard - James Patterson
 Blue Bistro - Elin Hilderbrand
 Looking for Peyton Place - Barbara Delinsky

Volume 285 - #3
 The Town That Came a Courtin - Ronda Rich
 The Sunflower - Richard Paul Evans
 Dead Simple - Peter James
 Magic Hour - Kristin HannahVolume 286 - #4 Sun at Midnight - Rosie Thomas
 Cover Your Assets - Patricia Smiley
 At First Sight - Nicholas Sparks
 False Impression - Jeffrey ArcherVolume 287 - #5 Rosie - Alan Titchmarsh
 Two Little Girls in Blue - Mary Higgins Clark
 The Hard Way - Lee Child
 Where Mercy Flows - Karen HarterVolume 288 - #6 Sailing to Capri - Elizabeth Adler
 A Christmas Guest - Anne Perry
 The Conjuror's Bird - Martin Davies
 Married to a Stranger - Patricia MacDonald

2007Volume 289 - #1 The Whistling Season - Ivan Doig
 Consigned to Death - Jane K. Cleland
 Orbit - John J. Nance
 Angels Fall - Nora RobertsVolume 290 - #2 Angels of Morgan Hill - Donna VanLiere
 The Saddlemaker's Wife - Earlene Fowler
 Echo Park - Michael Connelly
 Under Orders - Dick Francis
 "The Glass Case" (short story) - Kristin HannahVolume 291 - #3 Dear John - Nicholas Sparks
 The Two Minute Rule - Robert Crais
 Can't Wait to Get to Heaven - Fannie Flagg
 A Whole New Life - Betsy ThorntonVolume 292 - #4 Autumn Blue - Karen Harter
 Bad Luck and Trouble - Lee Child
 Tallgrass - Sandra Dallas
 Winter's Child - Margaret MaronVolume 293 - #5 Shadow Dance - Julie Garwood
 Francesca's Kitchen - Peter Pezzelli
 The Sleeping Doll - Jeffery Deaver
 Garden Spells - Sarah Addison AllenVolume 294 - #6 No Time for Goodbye - Linwood Barclay
 Daddy's Girl - Lisa Scottoline
 Thunder Bay - William Kent Krueger
 I Heard That Song Before - Mary Higgins Clark

2008Volume 295 - #1 The Overlook - Michael Connelly
 Meet Me in Venice - Elizabeth Adler
 Step on a Crack - James Patterson & Michael Ledwidge
 An Irish Country Doctor - Patrick TaylorVolume 296 - #2 Bad Blood - Linda Fairstein
 The Long Walk Home - Will North
 The Blue Zone - Andrew Gross
 Iris & Ruby - Rosie Thomas
 "James Penney's New Identity" (short story) - Lee ChildVolume 297 - #3 The Ghost - Robert Harris
 The Choice - Nicholas Sparks
 The Watchman - Robert Crais
 Her Royal Spyness - Rhys BowenVolume 298 - #4 Blue Heaven - C. J. Box
 The First Patient - Michael Palmer
 The Sugar Queen - Sarah Addison Allen
 Dead Heat - Dick Francis & Felix FrancisVolume 299 - #5 Sundays at Tiffany's - James Patterson & Gabrielle Charbonnet
 Lady Killer - Lisa Scottoline
 The Christmas Promise - Donna VanLiere
 Final Theory - Mark AlpertVolume 300 - #6 Where Are You Now? - Mary Higgins Clark
 A Single Thread - Marie Bostwick
 An Irish Country Village - Patrick Taylor
 Italian Lessons - Peter Pezzelli

2009Volume 301 - #1 Nothing to Lose - Lee Child
 Remember Me? - Sophie Kinsella
 Don't Tell a Soul - David Rosenfelt
 Leaving Jack - Gareth Crocker
 Pets - nicole macdonaldVolume 302 - #2 The Brass Verdict - Michael Connelly
 Crossroads - Belva Plain
 Guilty - Karen Robards
 Hannah's Dream - Diane HammondVolume 303 - #3 The Lucky One - Nicholas Sparks
 A Foreign Affair - Caro Peacock
 Envy the Night - Michael Koryta
 The Last Lecture - Randy Pausch with Jeffrey ZaslowVolume 304 - #4 Silks - Dick Francis and Felix Francis
 Very Valentine - Adriana Trigiani
 Chasing Darkness - Robert Crais
 Water, Stone, Heart - Will NorthVolume 305 - #5 Still Life - Joy Fielding
 Grace - Richard Paul Evans
 Hell Bent - William G. Tapply
 Prayers for Sale - Sandra DallasVolume 306 - #6 Love in Bloomt - Sheila Roberts
 Pursuit - Karen Robards
 Serendipity - Louise Shaffer
 The Nine Lessons - Kevin Alan Milne

2010Volume 307 - #1 Gone Tomorrow - Lee Child
 Lost & Found - Jacqueline Sheehan
 The Murder of Tut -  James Patterson and Michael Dugard
 La's Orchestra Saves the World - Alexander McCall SmithVolume 308 - #2 The Scarecrow - Michael Connelly
 The French Gardener - Santa Montefiore
 Heaven's Keep - William Kent Krueger
 The Art of Racing in the Rain - Garth SteinVolume 309 - #3 Winter Garden - Kristin Hannah
 The Poacher's Son - Paul Doiron
 A Thread So Thin - Marie Bostwick
 Half Broke Horses - Jeannette WallsVolume 310 - #4 Villa Mirabella - Peter Pezzelli
 Rainwater - Sandra Brown
 The First Rule - Robert Crais
 The Girl Who Chased the Moon - Sarah Addison AllenVolume 311 - #5 The Christmas List - Richard Paul Evans
 From Cradle to Grave - Patricia MacDonald
 Spinning Forward - Terri DuLong
 Blood Lines - Kathryn CaseyVolume 312 - #6 The Mountain Between Us - Charles Martin
 Nine Dragons - Michael Connelly
 A Dog's Purpose - W. Bruce Cameron
 This Time Together  - Carol Burnett

2011Volume 313 - #1 61 Hours - Lee Child
 Small Change - Sheila Roberts
 Nowhere to Run -  C. J. Box
 Leaving Unknown - Kerry ReichsVolume 314 - #2 Crossfire - Dick Francis and Felix Francis
 Sweet Misfortune - Kevin Alan Milne
 Outwitting Trolls - William G. Tapply
 Letters from Home - Kristina McMorrisVolume 315 - #3 Safe Haven - Nicholas Sparks
 The Sentry -  Robert Crais
 An Irish Country Courtship - Patrick Taylor
 The Provence Cure for the Brokenhearted - Bridget AsherVolume 316 - #4 Never Look Away - Linwood Barclay
 Promise Me - Richard Paul Evans
 Lipstick in Afghanistan - Roberta Gately
 I Still Dream About You - Fannie FlaggVolume 317 - #5 Now You See Her - Joy Fielding
 The Peach Keeper - Sarah Addison Allen
 Buried Secrets - Joseph Finder
 The Oracle of Stamboul - Michael David LukasVolume 318 - #6 The Orchard - Jeffrey Stepakoff
 Worth Dying For - Lee Child
 How to Bake a Perfect Life - Barbara O'Neal
 On Borrowed Time - David Rosenfelt

2012Volume 319 - #1 One Summer - David Baldacci
 Cast Into Doubt - Patricia MacDonald
 Casting About - Terri DuLong
 The Lion - Nelson DeMilleVolume 320 - #2 The Final Note - Kevin Alan Milne
 Dick Francis Gamble - Felix Francis
 The Orchard - Theresa Weir
 Lethal - Sandra BrownVolume 321 - #3 A Dublin Student Doctor - Patrick Taylor
 The Underside of Joy - Sere Prince Halverson
 Three-Day Town - Margaret Maron
 Emory's Gift - W. Bruce CameronVolume 322 - #4 The Bungalow - Sarah Jio
 The Drop - Michael Connelly
 The Best of Me - Nicholas Sparks
 Love in a Nutshell - Janet Evanovich and Dorien KellyVolume 323 - #5 Home Front - Kristin Hannah
 I've Got Your Number - Sophie Kinsella
 The House of Silk - Anthony Horowitz
 The Christmas Note - Donna VanLiereVolume 324 - #6 Oath of Office - Michael Palmer
 Thunder and Rain - Charles Martin
 Ice Fire - David Lyons
 Saving Ceecee Honeycutt - Beth Hoffman

2013Volume 325 - #1 Lost December - Richard Paul Evans
 XO - Jeffery Deaver
 Beach House Memories - Mary Alice Monroe
 Missing Child - Patricia MacDonaldVolume 326 - #2 The Innocent - David Baldacci
 Beach Colors - Shelley Noble
 The Third Gate - Lincoln Child
 Calling Invisible Women - Jeanne RayVolume 327 - #3 Bloodline - Dick Francis
 The View from Here - Cindy Myers
 A Wanted Man - Lee Child
 Miss Dreamsville - Amy Hill HearthVolume 328 - #4 The One Good Thing - Kevin Alan Milne
 A Cold and Lonely Place - Sara J. Henry
 The Man Who Forgot His Wife - John O'Farrell
 Close Your Eyes - Iris Johansen and Roy JohansenVolume 329 - #5 The Irresistible Blueberry Bakeshop & Cafe - Mary Simses
 Blackberry Winter - Sarah Jio
 Suspect - Robert Crais
 There Was an Old Woman - Hallie EphronVolume 330 - #6 The Silver Star - Jeannette Walls
 Political Suicide - Michael Palmer
 A Street Cat Named Bob - James Bowen
 Fly Away - Kristin Hannah

2014Volume 331 - #1 The Summer Girls - Mary Alice Monroe
 The Glassblower's Apprentice - Peter Pezzelli
 The Hit - David Baldacci
 The Good Dream - Donna VanLiereVolume 332 - #2 Unwritten - Charles Martin
 The Promise - Ann Weisgarber
 Never Go Back - Lee Child
 Stargazey Point - Shelley NobleVolume 333 - #3 Forever Friday - Timothy Lews
 The Rosie Project - Graeme Simsion
 Deadline - Sandra Brown
 Melody of Secrets - Jeffrey StepakoffVolume 334 - #4 Doing Harm - Kelly Parsons
 Lost Lake - Sarah Addison Allen
 Sisters - Patricia MacDonald
 The Longest Ride - Nicholas SparksVolume 335 - #5 Goodnight June - Sarah Jio
 Those Who Wish Me Dead - Michael Koryta
 Looking for Me - Beth Hoffman
 The Girl with a Clock for a Heart - Peter SwansonVolume 336 - #6 Suspicion - Joseph Finder
 Dog Gone, Back Soon - Nick Trout
 The Wishing Thread - Lisa Van Allen
 Without Warning - David Rosenfelt

2015Volume 337 - #1 Invisible - James Patterson and David Ellis
 The Glass Kitchen - Linda Francis Lee
 Invisible City - Julia Dahl
 Journey from Darkness - Garreth CrockerVolume 338 - #2 Personal - Lee Child
 You Knew Me When - Emily Liebert
 The Monogram Murders - Sophie Hannah
 Star Gazing - Linda GillardVolume 339 - #3 Girl Underwater - Claire Kells
 Never Come Back - David Bell
 A Life Intercepted - Charles Martin
 Mean Streak - Sandra BrownVolume 340 - #4 The Story of Us - Dani Atkins
 Windigo Island - William Kent Krueger
 The Mistletoe Promise - Richard Paul Evans
 Resistant - Michael PalmerVolume 341 - #5 The Burning Room - Michael Connelly
 First Frost - Sarah Addison Allen
 The Silent Sister - Diane Chamberlain
 Lawyer for the Dog - Lee RobinsonVolume 342 - #6 Memory Man - David Baldacci
 Eight Hundred Grapes - Laura Dave
 Moriarty - Anthony Horowitz
 The Christmas Light - Donna VanLiere

2016Volume 343 - #1 The Bullet - Mary Louise Kelly
 The Cherry Harvest - Lucy Sanna
 One Mile Under - Andrew Gross
 Miss Dreamsville and the Lost Heiress of Collier County - Amy Hill HearthVolume 344 - #2 Carrying Albert Home - Homer Hickam
 What Doesn't Kill Her - Carla Norton
 Love Gently Falling - Melody Carlson
 Radiant Angel - Nelson DeMilleVolume 345 - #3 Make Me - Lee Child
 Come Hell or Highball - Maia Chance
 Summit Lake - Charlie Donlea
 The Good Neighbor - Amy Sue NathanVolume 346 - #4 Front Runner - Felix Francis
 The Charm Bracelet - Viola Shipman
 The Precipice - Paul Doiron
 Not Forgetting the Whale - John IronmongerVolume 347 - #5 The Crossing - Michael Connelly
 Piece of Mind - Michelle Adelman
 The Mistletoe Inn - Richard Paul Evans
 The Unexpected Inheritance of Inspector Chopra - Vaseem KhanVolume 348 - #6 The City Baker's Guide to Country Living - Louise Miller
 Hostage Taker - Stefanie Pintoff
 Billy and Me - Giovanna Fletcher
 Arrowood - Laura McHugh

2017Volume 349 - #1 The Rules of Love and Grammar - Mary Simses
 I Let You Go - Clare Mackintosh
 The Dollhouse - Fiona Davis
 Sit! Stay! Speak! - Annie England NobleVolume 350 - #2 Night School - Lee Child
 The Bookshop on the Corner - Jenny Colgan
 Among the Wicked - Linda Castillo
 One True Loves - Taylor Jenkins ReidVolume 351 - #3 Guilty Minds - Joseph Finder
 A Lowcountry Wedding - Mary Alice Monroe
 The Branson Beauty - Claire Booth
 The Hope Chest - Viola ShipmanVolume 352 - #4 Burning Bright - Nicholas Petrie
 The Curious Charms of Arthur Pepper - Phaedra Patrick
 The Vanishing Year - Kate Moretti
 I'm Still Here - Clelie AvitVolume 353 - #5 The Wrong Side of Goodbye - Michael Connelly
 Miramar Bay - Davis Bunn
 Triple Crown - Felix Francis
 The Mistletoe Secret - Richard Paul EvansVolume 354 - #6 My Not So Perfect Life - Sophie Kinsella
 The Twelve Dogs of Christmas - David Rosenfelt
 Don't You Cry - Mary Kubica
 Home Sweet Home - April Smith

2018Volume 355 - #1 A Dog's Way Home - W. Bruce Cameron
 Down a Dark Road - Linda Castillo
 Virtually Perfect - Paige Roberts
 Knife Creek - Paul DoironVolume 356 - #2 The Switch - Joseph Finder
 Beach House for Rent - Mary Alice Monroe
 You'll Never Know Dear - Hallie Ephron
 Before You Go - Clare SwatmanVolume 357 - #3 The Wanted - Robert Crais
 Rise & Shine, Benedict Stone - Phaedra Patrick
 The Vanishing Season - Joanna Schaffhausen
 Talk to the Paw - Melinda MetzVolume 358 - #4 The Midnight Line - Lee Child
 The Address - Fiona Davis
 Another Man's Ground - Claire Booth
 And All the Phases of the Moon - Judy Reene SingerVolume 359 - #5 Two Kinds of Truth - Michael Connelly
 The Noel Diary - Richard Paul Evans
 Sulfur Springs - William Kent Krueger
 Dreaming in Chocolate - Susan Bishop CrispellVolume 360 - #6 The Bad Daughter - Joy Fielding
 The Recipe Box - Viola Shipman
 The First Family - Michael and Daniel Palmer
 Collared - David RosenfeltVolume 361 - #7 The Disappeared - C. J. Box
 Dear Mrs. Bird - A. J. Pearce
 The Echo Killing - Christi Daugherty
 Between You and Me - Susan WiggsVolume 362 - #8 Stay Hidden - Paul Doiron
 The Late Bloomers Club - Louise Miller
 The Girl in the Woods - Patricia MacDonald
 The Light Over London - Julia Kelly

2019Volume 363 - #1 Don't Believe It - Charlie Donlea
 Rainy Day Friends - Jill Shalvis
 By His Own Hand - Neal Griffin
 When the Men Were Gone - Marjorie Herrera LewisVolume 364 - #2 The Last Time I Lied - Riley Sager
 A Borrowing of Bones - Paula Munier
 Not Our Kind - Kitty Zeldis
 A Gathering of Secrets - Linda CastilloVolume 365 - #3 Past Tense - Lee Child
 Hope on the Inside - Marie Bostwick
 Forever and a Day - Anthony Horowitz
 The Last Road Trip - Gareth CrockerVolume 366 - #4 Judgment - Joseph Finder
 The Military Wife - Laura Trentham
 Desolation Mountain - William Kent Krueger
 An Anonymous Girl - Greer Hendricks and Sarah PekkanenVolume 367 - #5 Long Road to Mercy - David Baldacci
 The Lieutenant's Nurse - Sarah Ackerman
 Things You Save in a Fire - Katherine Center
 The Noel Stranger - Richard Paul EvansVolume 368 – #6 Dark Site – Patrick Lee
 Dating By The Book – Mary Ann Marlowe
 Wolf Pack – C. J. Fox
 Deck The Hounds – David Rosenfelt

2020Volume 369 - #1 - December 2019 
 A Dangerous Man – Robert Crais
 The Book Charmer – Karen Hawkins
 A Beautiful Corpse – Christy Daughery
 Drawing Home – Jamie BrennerVolume 370 – #2 - February 2020 The Turn of The Key – Ruth Ware
 A Beach Wish – Shelly Noble
 Layover – David Bell
 A Deadly Turn – Claire BoothVolume 371 – #3 - April 2020 Wherever She Goes – Kelley Armstrong
 The Fifth Column – Andrew Gross
 Thin Ice – Paige Shelton
 The Me I Use To Be – Jennifer RyanVolume 372 - #4 - June 2020 Lock Every Door – Riley Sager
 Shamed – Linda Castillo
 The Whispers of War – Julia Kelly
 Careful What You Wish For – Hallie EphronVolume 373 - #5 - August 2020 House on Fire – Joseph Finder
 An Everyday Hero – Laura Trentham
 Blind Search – Paula Munier
 Let it Snow – Nancy ThayerVolume 374 - #6 - September 2020 The Wild One – Nick Petrie
 Dachshund Through the Snow – David Rosenfelt
 No Bad Deed – Heather Chavez
 Noel Street – Richard Paul EvansVolume 375 - #7 - November 2020 Long Range – C. J. Box
 What You Wish For – Katherine Center
 The New Husband – D. J. Palmer
 The Heirloom Garden – Viola Shipman

2021Volume 376 - #1 - January 2021 Revolver Road – Christi Daugherty
 The Big Finish – Brooke Fossey
 Murder in Chianti – Camilla Trinchieri
 The Second Chance Boutique – Louisa LeamanVolume 377 - #2 - March 2021 The Last Flight – Julie Clark
 Of Mutts and Men – Spencer Quinn
 Beachside Beginnings – Sheila Roberts
 The Fate of a Flapper – Susanna CalkinsVolume 378 - #3 - May 2021 The Sentinel – Lee Child and Andrew Child
 Maggie Finds Her Muse – Dee Ernst
 Outsider – Linda Castillo
 Love At First – Kate ClaybornVolume 379 - #4 - June 2021 To Tell You the Truth – Gilly Macmillan
 Twice Shy – Sarah Hogle
 Every Last Fear – Alex Finlay
 Fortune Favors the Dead – Stephen SpotswoodVolume 380 - #5 - August 2021 The Breaker – Nick Petrie
 The Last Thing He Told Me – Laura Dave
 The Secrets of Love Story Bridge – Phaedra Patrick
 Silent Bite – David RosenfeltVolume 381 - #6 - September 2021 Cold Wind – Paige Shelton
 The Second Life of Mirielle West – Amanda Skenandore
 Runner – Tracy Clark
 The Noel Letters – Richard Paul EvansVolume 382 - #7 - November 2021 Dark Sky – C. J. Box
 A Peculiar Combination – Ashley Weaver
 Meet Me in Paradise – Libby Hubscher
 Her Three Lives – Cate Holahan

2022Volume 383 - #1 - January 2022 Lightning Strike – William Kent Krueger
 Arsenic and Adobo – Mia P. Manansala
 The Last Chance Library – Freya Sampson
 A Deadly Twist – Jeffrey SigerVolume 384 - #2 - March 2022 Fallen – Linda Castillo
 Yours Cheerfully – AJ Pearce
 Dead by Dawn – Paul Doiron
 A Spot of Trouble – Teri WilsonVolume 385 - #3 - May 2022 2 Sisters Detective Agency – James Patterson and Candice Fox
 The Lost and Found Necklace – Louisa Leaman
 Girl in Ice – Erica Ferencik
 The Family You Make – Jill ShalvisVolume 386 - #4 - June 2022 The Golden Couple – Greer Hendricks and Sarah Pekkanen
 Love, Lists, and Fancy Ships – Sarah Grunder Ruiz
 The Mad Girls of New York – Maya Rodale
 A Fire in the Night – Christopher SwannVolume 387 - #5 - August 2022 The Night Shift – Alex Finlay
 The Secret of Snow – Viola Shipman
 The Maid – Nita Prose
 This Golden State – Marit WeisenbergVolume 388 - #6 - September 2022 Vanishing Edge – Claire Kells
 The Bodyguard – Katherine Center
 The Matchmaker – Paul Vidich
 Best in Snow – David RosenfeltVolume 389 - #6 - November 2022 Take Your Breath Away – Linwood Barelay
 The Key to Deceit – Ashley Weaver
 The Unsinkable Gretta James – Jennifer E. Smith
 Lucy Checks In – Dee Ernst

2023Volume 390- #1 - January 2023'''
 Fox Creek – William Kent Krueger
 Nora Goes Off Script – Annabel Monaghan
 Last Call at the Nightingale – Katharine Schellman
 Other Birds'' – Sarah Addison Allen

References

External links
 Reader's Digest Select Editions store

Fiction anthologies
Select Editions
Anthology series